The 2022 Abilene Christian Wildcats football team represented Abilene Christian University in the 2022 NCAA Division I FCS football season. The Wildcats played their home games at Anthony Field at Wildcat Stadium in Abilene, Texas, and competed in the Western Athletic Conference (WAC). They were led by first-year head coach Keith Patterson.

Schedule

References

Abilene Christian
Abilene Christian Wildcats football seasons
Abilene Christian Wildcats football